Tolidopalpus is a genus of beetles in the family Mordellidae, containing the following species:

 Tolidopalpus bimaculatus Shiyake, 1997
 Tolidopalpus castaneicolor Ermisch, 1952
 Tolidopalpus galloisi (Kôno, 1932)
 Tolidopalpus kalimantanensis Shiyake, 1995
 Tolidopalpus sakaii Shiyake, 1997

References

Mordellidae